Dennis Kelleher (20 November 1918 – 20 February 2002) was an Irish footballer who represented Great Britain at the 1948 Summer Olympics. Dennis played amateur football with Barnet, winning the FA Amateur Cup in 1946; he also earned 8 amateur caps for Ireland. Kelleher also represented touring team Middlesex Wanderers.

During World War II, Kelleher served as a lieutenant in the Royal Naval Volunteer Reserve, and was captured while serving in Egypt, later escaping from a German prisoner-of-war camp.

References

1918 births
2002 deaths
Republic of Ireland association footballers
Barnet F.C. players
Middlesex Wanderers A.F.C. players
Footballers at the 1948 Summer Olympics
Olympic footballers of Great Britain
Royal Navy officers of World War II
British World War II prisoners of war
British escapees
People from Dungarvan
Association football forwards
Royal Naval Volunteer Reserve personnel of World War II
Escapees from German detention
World War II prisoners of war held by Germany